The Manor of Northstead is a 1954 comedy play by the British writer William Douglas Home. It is a sequel to his 1947 hit The Chiltern Hundreds. The title refers to the Manor of Northstead.

It premiered at the Theatre Royal, Nottingham before transferring to the Duchess Theatre in London's West End where it ran for 307 performances between 28 April 1954 and 22 January 1955. The original London cast included A.E. Matthews, Jean Lodge, Marie Lohr, Charles Heslop, Bryan Coleman, Ronald Adam, Arthur Hewlett and Viola Lyel.

Original cast
Beecham - Charles Heslop
Captain Lord Pym, MC (Tony) - Bryan Coleman
Lady Cleghorn (Caroline) - Viola Lyel
Lady Pym (June) - Jean Lodge
Lady Pym (June) (Replacement) - Anne Rawsthorne
Lord Cleghorn - Ronald Adam
Mrs Beecham (Bessie) - Lorraine Clewes
Sir Ronald MacRonald	- Arthur Hewlett
The Countess of Lister -	Marie Lohr
The Earl of Lister	- A. E. Matthews

References

Bibliography
 Wearing, J.P. The London Stage 1950-1959: A Calendar of Productions, Performers, and Personnel.  Rowman & Littlefield, 2014.

1954 plays
West End plays
Comedy plays
Plays by William Douglas-Home